AAFES Depot Grünstadt is the German name for the GRDC Gruenstadt Distribution Center of the AAFES. In Grünstadt it is simply called the “depot”. The "depot" was founded in 1953. The bakery located in the depot  Grünstadt is providing most of the bakery products for US Service Members and their families in Germany and Europe. In the 1970 and 1980 the depot was one of the most important source for work in Grünstadt, but in our days (2007) it has lost most of its economic importance for the regional economy of Grünstadt and its surroundings like the Leiningerland.

Some historical information about the "Grünstadt Depot" can be found under : http://www.usarmygermany.com/Units/AAFES-Eur/USAREUR_AAFES.htm

United States Army logistics installations
Military installations of the United States in Germany